Aleksandr Borisovich Nikitin (4 February 1961 – 14 January 2021) was a Russian professional football coach and player.

Club career
He made his professional debut in the Soviet Second League in 1978 for FC Rotor Volgograd.

Honours
 Russian Premier League runner-up: 1993.

Personal life
His son Oleg Nikitin played football professionally.

References

1961 births
2021 deaths
Sportspeople from Volgograd
Soviet footballers
Russian footballers
Association football forwards
Russian expatriate footballers
Expatriate footballers in Finland
Russian Premier League players
FC Energiya Volzhsky players
FC Rotor Volgograd players
FC SKA Rostov-on-Don players
Russian football managers
FC Rotor Volgograd managers